The 1975–76 Coppa Italia was the 29th season of Coppa Italia, the major Italian domestic association football cup. The competition was won by Napoli, who defeated Verona in a one-legged final played at the Stadio Olimpico in Rome.

First round
The first round of the tournament consisted of seven groups with five teams each who played each other once in a single round robin format. All matches took place between 27 August and 21 September 1975. The seven group winners, joined by the defending champions Fiorentina, progressed to the second round.

Group 1

Group 2

Group 3

Group 4

Group 5

Group 6

Group 7

Second round
Join the defending champion: Fiorentina.

Group A

Group B

Final

Top goalscorers

See also

1975–76 Serie A
1975–76 Serie B

References 

rsssf.com

Coppa Italia seasons
Coppa Italia